Nutley may refer to:

People
Ben Nutley (born 1992), English rugby union player
Bobby Nutley (1916–1996), Scottish football (soccer) player
Colin Nutley (born 1944), English director
Danny Nutley (born 1974), Australian former rugby league footballer
Molly Nutley (born 1995), Swedish actress
Richard Nutley (1670–1729), Irish judge
Zara Nutley (1926–2016), British television actress

Places

England 
Nutley, East Sussex, a village
Nutley Windmill, in the above village
Nutley, Hampshire, a village and civil parish

United States 
Nutley, New Jersey, a township in the United States
Nutley Public Schools, a public school district in the above township
Nutley High School, in the above school district
 Nutley Street, a road in Fairfax County, Virginia